Nikolay Kuchurin (11 October 1927 – 16 June 1995) was a Soviet middle-distance runner. He competed in the men's 1500 metres at the 1952 Summer Olympics.

References

1927 births
1995 deaths
Athletes (track and field) at the 1952 Summer Olympics
Soviet male middle-distance runners
Olympic athletes of the Soviet Union
Place of birth missing